Cambrian Stage 3 is the still unnamed third stage of the Cambrian. It succeeds Cambrian Stage 2 and precedes Cambrian Stage 4, although neither its base nor top have been formally defined.  The plan is for its lower boundary to correspond approximately to the first appearance of trilobites, about  million years ago, though the globally asynchronous appearance of trilobites warrants the use of a separate, globally synchronous marker to define the base. The upper boundary and beginning of Cambrian Stage 4 is informally defined as the first appearance of the trilobite genera Olenellus or Redlichia around  million years ago.

Naming
The International Commission on Stratigraphy has not officially named the 3rd stage of the Cambrian. The stage approximately corresponds to the "Atdabanian", which is used by geologists working in Siberia.

Biostratigraphy
The oldest trilobite known is Lemdadella which appears at the beginning of the Fallotaspis zone. The Cambrian radiation of animal phyla ends here, after the diversification and origination of arthropods, molluscs, lophophorates, chordates (including vertebrates) among others.

References
 

Cambrian geochronology
Geological ages
Cambrian Series 2